"The War with the Fnools" is a science fiction short story by American writer Philip K. Dick.  It was first published in Galaxy magazine in 1969.

The Fnools are invaders who appear to be two-foot-tall human beings. They take on the guise of Volkswagen mechanics, ethnic circus performers, and similar roles, unaware that they stand out for being unusually short. Then a Fnool discovers that if one of their kind partakes in an activity associated with "vice" (initially tobacco and alcohol), all Fnools gain two feet in height.  When they do these the Fnools become indistinguishable from human beings, albeit temporarily, before one engages in sex and they all become inhumanly tall.

Dick said of the story:

References

External links 
 

Short stories by Philip K. Dick
1969 short stories
Works originally published in Galaxy Science Fiction